Ostariophysi is the second-largest superorder of fish. Members of this superorder are called ostariophysians. This diverse group contains 10,758 species, about 28% of known fish species in the world and 68% of freshwater species, and are present on all continents except Antarctica. They have a number of common characteristics such as an alarm substance and a Weberian apparatus. Members of this group include fish important to people for food, sport, the aquarium industry, and research.

Taxonomy 
The superorder is divided into two series, Anotophysi and Otophysi. However, in older literature, Ostariophysi was restricted only to the fish that are currently classified under Otophysi. Otophysi was coined in 1970 by Rosen and Greenwood to separate the traditional Ostariophysians from the added Gonorynchiformes.

The superorder is classified below:
Series Anotophysi
 Gonorynchiformes, about 37 species 
Series Otophysi (Euostariophysi)
 Cypriniformes (minnows and allies), about 4,501 species (contains Cyprinidae, largest family of freshwater fishes)
 Characiformes (characins and allies), about 2,168 species
 Siluriformes (catfishes), about 3,813 species
 Gymnotiformes (electric eels, American knifefishes), about 239 species (sometimes grouped under Siluriformes)

The monophyly of Ostariophysi has come into question with molecular evidence. Gonorynchiformes is more closely related to Clupeiformes than Otophysi. It is possible that the Gonorynchiformes and Clupeiformes form a monophyletic group. There is evidence for a sister group relationship between Ostariophysi and Clupeomorpha (the taxon Ostarioclupeomorpha, also known as Otocephala, was coined to describe this possibly monophyletic group).

Evolution
Ostariophysian fossils, both anotophysan and otophysian, are known from the early Cretaceous. Ostariophysian fossils are known from every continent except Australia.

Ostariophysians are currently distributed worldwide on all continents except Antarctica. The common ancestor of this group entered fresh water about  coincident with the global decrease in oxygen levels in marine waters. The Otophysi originated in freshwaters during the Jurassic (c. 200-145 Ma) before the breakup of the super continent Pangea. The division of the Otophysi into the four extant clades closely follows the breakup of Pangea.  The separation of Laurasia in the north from Gondwana in the south isolated the lineages which gave rise to the modern Cyprinoformes and Characiphysi.  The Characiphysi then was itself divided into the diurnal (day-active) Characiformes and the nocturnal (night-active) Siluriphysi, including Siluriformes and Gymnotiformes. Modern Characiformes are present in both South America and Africa, and have relatively recently extended their range to North America. The Siluriphysi are characterized by many derived traits, including notably, electroreception. The Siluriphysi originated before the breakup of Gondwana into South America and Africa in the Aptian (c. 110 Ma) but the presence of several basal Siluriphysan taxa in modern South America (Gymnotiformes, Diplomystidae, Loricaridea) suggest that the Siluriphysi may have originated on the western portion of Gondwana. Alternatively, these basal taxa have subsequently become extinct in Africa. The modern distribution of Siluriformes is cosmopolitan due to subsequent dispersal.

Diversity
Ostariophysi is the second largest teleost superorder. It includes five major lineages and is a very diverse group. As of 2006 (Nelson), the five orders contain 1,075 genera in 64 families and about 7,931 species, which is about 28% of all known fish species. The four largest families in this group (Cyprinidae, Characidae, Loricariidae, and Balitoridae) include 4,656 species, over half (59%) of ostariophysian species. Cyprinidae itself is the largest fresh water fish family and the largest family of vertebrates after Gobiidae. Ostariophysians account for about 68% of all freshwater species; in fact, there are only about 123 marine species (Chanidae, Gonorynchidae, most Ariidae, about half of Plotosidae). They are present on all continents and major land masses except Antarctica, Greenland, and New Zealand.

This group includes a wide variety of different fishes. It contains one of the largest freshwater fish ever caught, the Mekong giant catfish, which can weigh up to about 300 kg. It also contains the smallest species of freshwater fish, Danionella translucida at only 12 mm in length. Some of these fish are able to breathe atmospheric oxygen (Clariidae) or even live out of water (Phreatobius cisternarum). Some Ostariphysans have the ability to produce electricity (Malapteruridae, Gymnotiformes).

Physical characteristics
Most species possess a swim bladder (except in Gonorynchus). The swim bladder is usually divided into two chambers. A smaller anterior chamber is partially or completely covered by a silvery peritoneal tunic. A larger posterior chamber may be reduced or absent in some groups. Minute, unicellular, horny projections known as "unculi" are commonly present on various body parts and are only known from ostariophysians.

Many ostariophysians have the characteristic of an alarm substance that is part of a fright reaction. This is a pheromone produced in epidermal club cells, and is similar or identical in all ostariophysians. When the fish is injured, this pheromone is released; other fish of the same species or similar species can smell this pheromone, causing a fright reaction. However, some fish possess the alarm substance without the fright reaction or lack both the alarm substance and the fright reaction to the alarm substance.

Weberian apparatus
In otophysians, one of the main characteristics is the Weberian apparatus. Apart from this structure, there is no other trait that could explain the success of otophysians. It is made up of a set of bones known as Weberian ossicles, a chain of small bones that connect the auditory system to the gas bladder of fishes. The ossicles connect the gas bladder wall with Y-shaped lymph sinus that abuts the lymph-filled transverse canal joining the sacculi of the right and left ears. This allows the transmission of vibrations to the inner ear.

In anotophysians, the three first vertebrae are specialized and associated with one or more cephalic ribs (a primitive Weberian apparatus). In the otophysians, a distinct modification of the anterior four or five first vertebrae is found, as well as the Weberian ossicles.

The fully functioning Weberian apparatus consists of the swim bladder, the Weberian ossicles, a portion of the anterior vertebral column, and some muscles and ligaments. It is named after the German anatomist and physiologist Ernst Heinrich Weber who first described the Weberian ossicles.

References

 
Fish superorders
Extant Early Cretaceous first appearances